Oedipodiella is a genus of moss in the family Gigaspermaceae; it contains the single species Oedipodiella australis.  This species is restricted to wooded areas of open grassland in South Africa, although a variety (O. australis var. catalaunica) is reported from Spain.

References

Monotypic moss genera
Gigaspermales